Inverclyde ("mouth of the Clyde") is one of 32 council areas used for local government in Scotland. Together with the East Renfrewshire and Renfrewshire council areas, Inverclyde forms part of the historic county of Renfrewshire, which currently exists as a registration county and lieutenancy area. Inverclyde is located in the west central Lowlands. It borders the North Ayrshire and Renfrewshire council areas, and is otherwise surrounded by the Firth of Clyde.

Inverclyde was formerly one of nineteen districts within Strathclyde Region, from 1975 until 1996. Prior to 1975, Inverclyde was governed as part of the local government county of Renfrewshire, comprising the burghs of Greenock, Port Glasgow and Gourock, and the former fifth district of the county. Its landward area is bordered by the Kelly, North and South Routen burns to the southwest (separating Wemyss Bay and Skelmorlie, North Ayrshire), part of the River Gryfe and the Finlaystone Burn to the south-east.

It is one of the smallest in terms of area and population out of the 32 Scottish unitary authorities. Along with the council areas clustered around Glasgow it is considered part of Greater Glasgow in some definitions, although it is physically separated from the city area by open countryside and does not share a border with the city.

The name derives from the extinct barony of Inverclyde (1897) conferred upon Sir John Burns of Wemyss Bay and his heirs.

Council

History
Inverclyde was created as a district in 1975 under the Local Government (Scotland) Act 1973, which established a two-tier structure of local government across mainland Scotland comprising upper-tier regions and lower-tier districts. Inverclyde was one of nineteen districts created within the region of Strathclyde. The district covered the area of four former districts from the historic county of Renfrewshire, all of which were abolished at the same time:
Greenock Burgh
Gourock Burgh
Port Glasgow Burgh
Fifth District, being the landward (outside a burgh) parts of the parishes of Greenock, Inverkip, Port Glasgow, and Kilmacolm.

The new district was named Inverclyde, meaning "mouth of the River Clyde", a name which had been coined in 1897 for the title of Baron Inverclyde which was conferred upon John Burns of Castle Wemyss, a large house at Wemyss Bay. The remaining parts of Renfrewshire were divided between the Eastwood and Renfrew districts. The three districts together formed a single lieutenancy area.

In 1996 the districts and regions were replaced with unitary council areas under the Local Government etc. (Scotland) Act 1994. In the debates leading up to that act, the government initially proposed replacing these three districts with two council areas: "West Renfrewshire", covering Inverclyde district and the western parts of Renfrew district, and "East Renfrewshire", covering Eastwood district and the eastern parts of Renfrew district. The proposals were not supported locally, with Inverclyde successfully campaigning to be allowed to form its own council area. The new council areas came into effect on 1 April 1996.

Communities

The area is divided into eleven community council areas, seven of which have community councils as at 2023 (being those with asterisks in the list below):

Gourock*
Greenock Central
Greenock East
Greenock Southwest*
Greenock West and Cardwell Bay*
Holefarm and Cowdenknowes
Inverkip and Wemyss Bay*
Kilmacolm*
Larkfield, Braeside and Branchton*
Port Glasgow East
Port Glasgow West*

Places of interest
Ardgowan Estate
The Bogal Stone
Cappielow
Castle Levan
Clyde Muirshiel Regional Park
Greenock Cut Visitor Centre
Custom House Quay and Museum
Duchal House
Finlaystone House
Gourock Outdoor Pool
Granny Kempock Stone
Loch Thom
Lunderston Bay
McLean Museum and Art Gallery
Newark Castle
Waterfront Leisure Complex

National voting
In the 2014 independence referendum, the "No" vote won in Inverclyde by just 86 votes and a margin of 0.2%. By either measure, this was the narrowest result of any of the 32 council areas. In the 2016 EU Referendum, Inverclyde posted a "Remain" vote of almost 64%.

Education
Inverclyde has twenty primary schools serving all areas of its settlements. These are:
 Aileymill Primary School, Greenock (merger of Larkfield and Ravenscraig primaries)
 All Saints Primary School, Greenock (merger of St. Kenneth's and St. Lawrence's primaries)
 Ardgowan Primary School, Greenock
 Gourock Primary School, Gourock
 Inverkip Primary School, Inverkip
 Kilmacolm Primary School, Kilmacolm/Port Glasgow
 King's Oak Primary School, Greenock (merger of King's Glen and Oakfield primaries)
 Lady Alice Primary School, Greenock
 Moorfoot Primary School, Gourock
 Newark Primary School, Port Glasgow (merger of Boglestone, Clune Park, Highholm and Slaemuir primaries)
 St. Andrew's Primary School, Greenock (merger of Sacred Heart and St. Gabriel's primaries)
 St. Francis' Primary School, Port Glasgow
 St. John's Primary School, Port Glasgow
 St. Joseph's Primary School, Greenock
 St. Mary's Primary School, Greenock
 St. Michael's Primary School, Port Glasgow
 St. Ninian's Primary School, Gourock
 St. Patrick's Primary School, Greenock
 Wemyss Bay Primary School, Wemyss Bay
 Whinhill Primary School, Greenock (merger of Highlanders' Academy and Overton primaries)

These are connected to several Secondary schools which serve Inverclyde as follows:
 Clydeview Academy, serving the West End of Greenock and the town of Gourock
 Inverclyde Academy, serving South and East Greenock as well as the villages of Inverkip and Wemyss Bay
 Notre Dame High School, serving Greenock
 Port Glasgow High School, serving Port Glasgow and Kilmacolm
 St Columba's High School, Gourock/Greenock, serving Gourock, Inverkip and Wemyss Bay
 St. Stephen's High School, serving Port Glasgow, Kilmacolm and the East End of Greenock
 Craigmarloch School which is an Additional Support Needs school for pupils aged 4–18 based at the new Port Glasgow Community Campus after the merging of Glenburn and Lilybank schools.

Demography
The average life expectancy for Inverclyde male residents (2013–2015) is 75.4 years, to rank 28th out of the 32 areas in Scotland. The average Inverclyde female lives for 80.4 years, to rank 26th out 32. There are large health disparities between settlements in Inverclyde with many health indicators being above the Scottish average in certain areas, whilst considerably below in others.

In 2019, the Inverclyde Council Area was rated as the most deprived in Scotland by the Scottish Index of Multiple Deprivation (SIMD), with Greenock Town Centre the most deprived community. (The term "deprivation" refers not only to low income according to the BBC, but may also include "fewer resources and opportunities, for example in health and education".) After the announcement, Deputy leader Jim Clocherty said that he hoped that investment money would arrive soon, and that "no part of Scotland wants to be labelled as the 'most deprived'". A £3m investment was scheduled for Greenock Town Centre and there was also plan to create a new cruise visitor centre with other investment funds being expected.

See also
List of places in Inverclyde

References

External links

Inverclyde Council website

 
Council areas of Scotland
Firth of Clyde